Villiam Strøm (born December 10, 1990) is a Norwegian ice hockey player who is currently playing for Vålerenga of the GET-ligaen.

Strøm competed in the 2018 IIHF World Championship as a member of the Norway men's national ice hockey team.

References

1990 births
Living people
Lillehammer IK players
Lørenskog IK players
Norwegian ice hockey defencemen
Sportspeople from Trondheim
Norwegian expatriate ice hockey people
Norwegian expatriate sportspeople in Sweden
Rosenborg IHK players
Stavanger Oilers players
Vålerenga Ishockey players